Melanitis leda, the common evening brown, is a common species of butterfly found flying at dusk. The flight of this species is erratic. They are found in Africa, South Asia and South-east Asia extending to parts of Australia.

Description

Wet-season form: Forewing: apex subacute; termen slightly angulated just below apex, or straight. Upperside brown. Forewing with two large subapical black spots, each with a smaller spot outwardly of pure white inwardly bordered by a ferruginous interrupted lunule; costal margin narrowly pale. Hindwing with a dark, white-centred, fulvous-ringed ocellus subterminally in interspace two, and the apical ocellus, sometimes also others of the ocelli, on the underside, showing through.

Underside paler, densely covered with transverse dark brown striae; a discal curved dark brown narrow band on forewing; a post-discal similar oblique band, followed by a series of ocelli: four on the forewing, that in interspace 8 the largest; six on the hindwing, the apical and subtornal the largest.

Dry-season form: Forewing: apex obtuse and more or less falcate; termen posterior to falcation straight or sinuous. Upperside: ground colour similar to that in the wet-season form, the markings, especially the ferruginous lunules inwardly bordering the black sub-apical spots on forewing, larger, more extended below and above the black costa. Hindwing: the ocellus in interspace 2 absent, posteriorly replaced by three or four minute white subterminal spots.

Underside varies in colour greatly. Antennae, head, thorax and abdomen in both seasonal forms brown or greyish brown: the antennae annulated with white, ochraceous at apex.

Ecology

Resident butterflies are known to fight off visitors to the area during dusk hours. This chase behaviour is elicited even by pebbles thrown nearby.

The caterpillars feed on a wide variety of grasses including rice (Oryza sativa), bamboos, Andropogon, Rotboellia cochinchinensis, Brachiaria mutica, Cynodon, Imperata, and millets such as Oplismenus compositus, Panicum and Eleusine indica.

Adults feed mainly on nectar, and in rare cases visit rotting fruits.

Image gallery

References

leda
Butterflies of Africa
Butterflies of Asia
Butterflies of Oceania
Butterflies of Indochina
Butterflies of Australia
Butterflies of Indonesia
Butterflies of Malaysia
Butterflies of Singapore
Lepidoptera of Cape Verde
Butterflies described in 1758
Taxa named by Carl Linnaeus
Insect pests of millets